Mamak may refer to:

 Mamak stall, a type of food establishment that serves mamak food
 Mamak Gang, a Malaysian gang active since the early 1990s
 Mamak rojak (or Indian rojak), the Malaysian version of a dish commonly prepared in Malaysia, Singapore, and Indonesia
 Mamak, a Persian language term meaning "little mother" or "kind and compassionate mother"
 Mamak, Ankara, a district of Ankara, Turkey